The following is the planned order of succession for the governorships of the 50 U.S. states, Washington, D.C. and the 5 organized territories of the United States, according to the constitutions (and supplemental laws, if any) of each. Some states make a distinction whether the succeeding individual is acting as governor or becomes governor.

From 1980 to 1999, there were 13 successions of governorships. From 2000 to 2019 this number increased to 29. The only instance since at least 1980 in which the second in line reached a state governorship was on January 8, 2002 when New Jersey Attorney General John Farmer Jr. acted as governor for 90 minutes between Donald DiFrancesco and John O. Bennett's terms in that capacity as president of the Senate following governor Christine Todd Whitman's resignation. In 2019, Secretary of Justice of Puerto Rico Wanda Vázquez Garced became governor when both the governor and secretary of state resigned in Telegramgate.

From 1945 to 2016, 39 of those who succeeded to the governorship ran for and won election to a full term.

States

Alabama
Established by Article V, Section 127 of the Constitution of Alabama.

Alaska
Established by Article III, Section 10 of the Constitution of Alaska.

Arizona
Established by Article V, Section 6 of the Constitution of Arizona.

Arkansas
Established by Article VI, Section 5 of the Constitution of Arkansas as amended.

California
Established by Article V, Section 10 of the Constitution of California and (GOV) Title 2, Division 3, Part 2, Art. 5.5 of the California Codes.

Colorado
Established by Article IV, Section 13(7) of the Constitution of Colorado.

Connecticut
Established by Article IV, Sections 18–21 of the Constitution of Connecticut.

Delaware
Established by Article III, Section 20 of the Constitution of Delaware.

Florida
Established by Article IV, Section 3 of the Constitution of Florida and Florida Statute 14.055.

Georgia
Established by Article V, Section 1, Paragraph V of the Constitution of Georgia.

Hawaii
Established by Article V, Section 4 of the Constitution of Hawaii and Title 4 §26-2 of the Hawaii code.

Idaho
Established by Article IV, Sections 12–14 of the Constitution of Idaho.

Illinois

Established by Article V, Section 6 of the Constitution of Illinois and the Governor Succession Act

Indiana
Established by Article V, Section 10 of the Constitution of Indiana.

Iowa
Established by Article IV, Sections 17–19 of the Constitution of Iowa.

Kansas
Established by KSA Statute 75–125 and the Emergency Interim Executive and Judicial Succession Act of 1994.

Kentucky

Established by Sections 84, 85 and 87 of the Kentucky Constitution.

Louisiana
Established by Article IV, Section 14 of the Constitution of Louisiana.

Maine
Established by Article V, Part 1, Section 14 of the Constitution of Maine.

Maryland
Established by Article II, Section 6 of the Constitution of Maryland.

Massachusetts

Established by Article LV of the Constitution of Massachusetts.

Michigan
Established by Article V, Section 26 of the Constitution of Michigan, Section 10.2 of the Revised Statutes of 1846 and the Emergency Interim Executive Succession Act (PA 202 of 1959, Section 31.4)

Minnesota
Established by Article V, Section 5 of the Minnesota Constitution and Minnesota Statute 4.06.

Mississippi
Established by Article V, Section 131 of the Constitution of Mississippi.

Missouri
Established by Article IV, Section 11(a) of the Constitution of Missouri.

Montana
Established by Article VI, Section 6 of the Constitution of Montana and Montana Code 2-16-511 to 2-16-513.

Nebraska
Established by Article IV, Section 16 of the Constitution of Nebraska and Nebraska Revised Statutes 84-120 and 84-121.

Nevada
Established by Nevada Revised Statute 223.080.

New Hampshire
Established by Part 2, Article 49 of the Constitution of New Hampshire.

New Jersey
Established by Article V, Section I, Paragraph 7 of the Constitution of New Jersey and New Jersey Revised Statute 52:14A-4.

New Mexico

Established by Article V, Section 7 of the Constitution of New Mexico

New York

Established by Article IV, Sections 5–6 of the New York Constitution and Article 1-A, Section 5 of the Defense Emergency Act of 1951.

North Carolina
Established by Article III, Section 3 of the Constitution of North Carolina and G.S. Section 147.11.1.

North Dakota
Established by Article V, Section 11 of the Constitution of North Dakota.

Ohio
Established by Article III, Section 15 of the Constitution of Ohio and Title I, Chapter 161 of the Ohio Revised Code.

Oklahoma

As provided by Article VI, Section 15 of the Constitution of Oklahoma and the Oklahoma Emergency Interim Executive and Judicial Succession Act.

Oregon

Established by Article V, Section 8a of the Constitution of Oregon

Pennsylvania
Established by Article IV, Sections 13–14 of the Pennsylvania Constitution

Rhode Island
Established by Article IX, Sections 9–10 of the Constitution of Rhode Island

South Carolina
Established by Article IV, Sections 6 and 7 of the South Carolina Constitution and South Carolina Code of Laws sections 1-3-120, 1-3-130 and 1-9-30.

South Dakota
Established by Article IV, Section 6 of the Constitution of South Dakota.

Tennessee

Established by Article III, Section 12 of the Constitution of Tennessee and Acts 1941, Chapter 99 §1.

Texas
Established by Article IV, Sections 3a and 16–18 of the Constitution of Texas and Chapter 401.023 of Title 4 the Texas Code.

Utah
Established by Article VII, Section 11 of the Constitution of Utah and the Emergency Interim Succession Act (C53-2a-803).

Vermont
Established by Chapter II, Section 20 of the Constitution of Vermont, 3 VSA §1 and 20 VSA §183.

Virginia
Established by Article V, Section 16 of the Constitution of Virginia.

Washington
Established by Article III, Section 10 of the Constitution of Washington.

West Virginia
Established by Article VII, Section 16 of the Constitution of West Virginia.

Wisconsin
Established by Article V, Sections 7 and 8 of the Constitution of Wisconsin.

Wyoming
Established by Article IV, Section 6 of the Wyoming Constitution.

Federal district

Washington, D.C.
Established by Title IV, Section 421(c)(2) of the District of Columbia Home Rule Act.

Organized territories

American Samoa
Established by Article IV, Section 4 Constitution of American Samoa and Section 4.0106 of the American Samoa Codes Annotated.

Guam
Established by Subchapter 1, Section 1422(b) of the Guam Organic Act of 1950.

Northern Mariana Islands
Established by Article III, Section 7 of the Northern Mariana Islands Commonwealth Constitution.

Puerto Rico

Established by Article IV, Section 8 of the Constitution of Puerto Rico and Law No. 7 of 2005

U.S. Virgin Islands
Established by Subsection IV §1595(b, e) of the Revised Organic Act of the Virgin Islands and the Executive Succession Act of 1972

Notes

References

United States politics-related lists
Political office-holders in the United States